Samopše is a municipality and village in Kutná Hora District in the Central Bohemian Region of the Czech Republic. It has about 200 inhabitants.

Administrative parts

In popular culture
A 15th century recreation of Samopše, called Samopesh, is featured in the video game Kingdom Come: Deliverance. The villages of Mrchojedy and Talmberk were also recreated.

References

External links

Villages in Kutná Hora District